John Hood (fl. 1421–1429), of Leominster, Herefordshire, was an English politician.

He may have been the son of John Hood, MP for Leominster in 1393–1399.

He was a Member (MP) of the Parliament of England for Leominster in May 1421 and 1429.

References

Year of birth missing
15th-century births
1429 deaths
English MPs May 1421
People from Leominster
English MPs 1429